The PFA Harry Kewell Medal is an annual award given for outstanding performance by an under-23 player playing in the A-League or overseas-based Australian. The award has been presented since 2008–09, and the winner is chosen by a vote amongst the members of the players' trade union, Professional Footballers Australia (PFA). It is named after former Australian star Harry Kewell, who represented Australia between 1996 and 2012, and was noted for his achievements from a young age. The first winner of the award was Perth Glory winger Nikita Rukavytsya. The current holder is Liberato Cacace, who won the award for his performances throughout the 2019–20 campaign for Wellington Phoenix.

As of 2020, only Mathew Ryan has won the award on more than one occasion. Two players from outside of Australia, Marco Rojas and Liberato Cacace (both from New Zealand), have won the award. Although they have their own dedicated award, players aged 23 or under at the start of the season remain eligible to win the PFA Men's Footballer of the Year award, and on one occasion the same player has won both awards for a season.

Winners
The award has been presented on 13 occasions as of 2020, with 11 different winners.

Breakdown of winners

By country

By club

See also
 PFA Footballer of the Year Awards

References

External links
PFA official website
A-League official website

Australian soccer trophies and awards
Awards established in 2009